Eberhard von Boremski (24 September 1914 – 16 December 1963) was a fighter pilot in the Luftwaffe of Nazi Germany during World War II. A flying ace, he was credited with 104 aerial victories—that is, 104 aerial combat encounters resulting in the destruction of the enemy aircraft—claimed in roughly 630 combat missions. Boremski was a recipient of the Knight's Cross of the Iron Cross.  He was killed in an accident in Hamburg on 16 December 1963.

Early life and career
Boremski was born 24 September 1914 in Conow, present-day part of Malliß, near Ludwigslust in the German Empire. He joined the Luftwaffe in 1939 and served initially in 5. Staffel (5th squadron) of Trägergruppe 186, which became II. Gruppe (2nd group) of Jagdgeschwader 77 (JG 77—77th Fighter Wing). On 1 March 1940, holding the rank of Unteroffizier (corporal), he was transferred to the newly created 7. Staffel of Jagdgeschwader 3 (JG 3—3rd Fighter Wing), a squadron of III. Gruppe. On 1 March 1940, III. Gruppe of JG 3 was formed at Jena under the command of Hauptmann Walter Kienitz. 7. Staffel was headed by Oberleutnant Erwin Neuerburg, also a former member of JG 77. The Gruppe was initially equipped with the Messerschmitt Bf 109 E-1 and E-3 variant.

World War II
World War II in Europe had begun on Friday 1 September 1939 when German forces invaded Poland. On 28 March 1940, III. Gruppe of JG 3 was considered operationally ready and transferred to Detmold Airfield where it was tasked with defending Germany's western border during the "Phoney War". On 10 April, the Gruppe relocated to Hopsten Airfield. In preparation for the Battle of France, III. Gruppe was subordinated to Luftflotte 2, supporting Army Group Bs attack into the Netherlands. Boremski claimed his first aerial victory on 29 May during the Battle of Dunkirk when he shot down a Royal Air Force (RAF) Supermarine Spitfire fighter on an early evening mission to the combat area. On 5 June, German forced launched Fall Rot (Case Red), the second phase of the conquest of France. Two days later, III. Gruppe fought in the vicinity of Beauvais where Boremski claimed a French Bréguet 693 ground-attack aircraft shot down. Following the Armistice of 22 June 1940, III. Gruppe was ordered to Dieppe on 29 June where the unit was tasked with patrolling the French coast at the English Channel.

On 30 June, III. Gruppe flew two fighter intercept missions against RAF forces attacking various targets near Lille. Defending against these attacks, Boremski, flying with 7. Staffel, claimed a Hawker Hurricane fighter shot down which was not confirmed. On 1 September, during the Battle of Britain, command of III. Gruppe was transferred to Hauptmann Wilhelm Balthasar when the former commander Kienitz had fallen ill. Boremski shot down the Bristol Blenheim bomber T1794 of No. 139 Squadron RAF on 24 September 1940. The Blenheim was on a mission against E-boats and fell into the English Channel. Squadron Leader M. F. Hendry, Sergeant P. M. Davidson and Sergeant V. Arrowsmith were killed in action. On 15 February 1941, III. Gruppe was ordered to Gütersloh Airfield in Germany for a period of rest and replenishment. At Gütersloh, the Gruppe received a full complement of the then new Bf 109 F-2 variant. On 3 May, III. Gruppe moved back to the English Channel front where it was based at Lillers. There, Boremski claimed his last aerial victory over the RAF on 25 May 1941. On 9 June, III. Gruppe was withdrawn from the west and ordered to transfer to Breslau-Gandau, the present day Wrocław–Copernicus Airport in Poland.

War against the Soviet Union
On 18 June, III. Gruppe relocated to Moderówka in south-eastern Poland. On 22 June, German forces launched Operation Barbarossa, the German invasion of the Soviet Union. At the start of the campaign, JG 3 was subordinated to the V. Fliegerkorps (5th Air Corps), under command of General der Flieger Robert Ritter von Greim, which was part of Luftflotte 4 (4th Air Fleet), under command of Generaloberst Alexander Löhr. These air elements supported Generalfeldmarschall Gerd von Rundstedt's Heeresgruppe Süd (Army Group South), with the objective of capturing the Ukraine and its capital Kiev. Boremski, who was now assigned to 9. Staffel under command of Oberleutnant Viktor Bauer, claimed his first aerial victories on the Eastern Front on 25 June. Operating from Moderówka, he had filed claim for two Potez 63 bombers which were misidentified Petlyakov Pe-2 bombers. On 26 June, III. Gruppe relocated to Hostynne.

On 6 November, III. Gruppe was withdrawn from the Eastern Front and sent to Mannheim-Sandhofen Airfield for a period of rest and replenishment. The first elements of the Gruppe arrived by train in Mannheim on 8 December, the transfer was completed a week later. There, the personnel was sent on home leave. The Gruppe received a full complement of 41 Messerschmitt Bf 109 F-4 aircraft and on 6 January 1942 was ordered to relocated to Sicily. On 13 January, 7. Staffel and elements of 8. and 9. Staffel boarded a train to Bari in southern Italy while the rest of III. Gruppe headed for Sciacca, Sicily. The relocation progressed until 26 January when new orders were received, ordering the Gruppe to return to Germany. At Jesau near Königsberg, present-day Kaliningrad in Russia, III. Gruppe began preparations for redeployment to the Eastern Front. 

Boremski was awarded the Knight's Cross of the Iron Cross on 3 May 1942 for achieving 43 victories. After serving as an instructor in mid 1942, he returned to JG 3. In February 1943 he was made Staffelkapitän (squadron leader) of 7. Staffel of JG 3, serving in this role until 30 May 1943, when he was wounded. He was succeeded by Hauptmann Karl-Heinz Langer as commander of 7. Staffel.

In early 1944 he was made commanding officer of Deutsch-Königlich Rumänischen Jagdverband (German Royal Romanian Fighter Unit) of Luftflotte 4, in collaboration with the Royal Romanian Air Force. On 24 February 1944, Oberleutnant Herbert Kutscha, the commander of 12. Staffel of JG 3 was wounded in combat. In consequence, Boremski took command of the Staffel the following day. On 11 April, Boremski flying Bf 109 G-6 (Werknummer 162585) was wounded following a mid-air collision west of Anklam with Gefreiter Horst Witzler from 10. Staffel. Although both pilots bailed out, command of 12. Staffel was transferred to Leutnant Hans Rachner.

From September 1944 to November 1944 Boremski led 1. Staffel of Jagdgruppe Ost and then 9. Staffel of Ergänzungs-Jagdgeschwader 1 (EJG 1—1st Supplementary Fighter Wing). In January 1945, Boremski was credited with his 100th aerial victory. He was the 97th Luftwaffe pilot to achieve the century mark.

Later life
After the German surrender, Boremski was handed over by U.S. troops in Czechoslovakia to the Soviet armed forces, and he remained a Prisoner of War until 1955. He died in an accident in Hamburg on 16 December 1963.

Summary of career

Aerial victory claims
According to US historian David T. Zabecki, Boremski was credited with 104 aerial victories. Obermaier also lists Boremski with 104 aerial victories claimed on 630 combat missions. This figure includes 100 claims on the Eastern Front, and four on the Western Front. Author Spick lists him with 90 aerial victories. Mathews and Foreman, authors of Luftwaffe Aces — Biographies and Victory Claims, researched the German Federal Archives and state that he claimed at least 88 aerial victories, plus two unconfirmed claims. Four of his aerial victories were claimed on the Western Front, the others on the Eastern Front. The authors indicate that he probably claimed further aerial victories with EJG 1 which cannot be verified through the archives.

Victory claims were logged to a map-reference (PQ = Planquadrat), for example "PQ 4932". These sectors were then subdivided into 36 smaller units to give a location area 3 × 4 km in size.

Awards
 Iron Cross (1939) 2nd and 1st Class
 Knight's Cross of the Iron Cross on 3 May 1942 as Oberfeldwebel and pilot in the 7./Jagdgeschwader 3 "Udet"
 German Cross in Gold on 12 July 1943 as Oberleutnant in the III./Jagdgeschwader 3

Notes

References

Citations

Bibliography

 
 
 
 
 
 
 
 
 
 
 
 
 
 
 
 
 
 
 
 
 
 
 
 

1914 births
1963 deaths
Luftwaffe pilots
German World War II flying aces
Recipients of the Gold German Cross
Recipients of the Knight's Cross of the Iron Cross
German prisoners of war in World War II held by the Soviet Union
German untitled nobility
People from the Grand Duchy of Mecklenburg-Schwerin
Accidental deaths in Germany
Military personnel from Mecklenburg-Western Pomerania